The Municipality of Železniki is a municipality in the Upper Carniola region of Slovenia. The seat of the municipality is the town of Železniki.

The municipality was established in its current form on 3 October 1994, when the former larger Municipality of Škofja Loka was subdivided into the municipalities of Gorenja Vas–Poljane, Škofja Loka, Železniki, and Žiri.

Settlements
In addition to the municipal seat of Železniki, the municipality also includes the following settlements:

 Davča
 Dolenja Vas
 Dražgoše
 Golica
 Kališe
 Lajše
 Martinj Vrh
 Ojstri Vrh
 Osojnik
 Podlonk
 Podporezen
 Potok
 Prtovč
 Ravne
 Rudno
 Selca
 Smoleva
 Spodnja Sorica
 Spodnje Danje
 Studeno
 Topolje
 Torka
 Zabrdo
 Zabrekve
 Zala
 Zali Log
 Zgornja Sorica
 Zgornje Danje

References

External links

Municipality of Železniki on Geopedia
Železniki municipal site

 
1994 establishments in Slovenia
Skofja Loka